Leslie Campbell is a Jamaican politician from the Labour Party. He is a member of the Senate of Jamaica and is Minister of State in the Ministry of Foreign Affairs and Foreign Trade in the Cabinet of Jamaica.

References 

Living people
21st-century Jamaican politicians
Members of the Senate of Jamaica
Jamaica Labour Party politicians
Government ministers of Jamaica
Year of birth missing (living people)